Lamenu Island is in Vanuatu. 'Lamenu' may also be,

Lamenu language
Lamenu Stadium